Selmer is a surname. Notable people with the surname include:

 Christian August Selmer (1816–1889), Norwegian lawyer, magistrate and politician
 Elisabeth Schweigaard Selmer (1923–2009), Norwegian judge and politician
 Ernst Sejersted Selmer (1920–2006), Norwegian mathematician
 Ernst W. Selmer (1890–1971), Norwegian philologist and phonetician
 Knut Selmer (1924–2009), Norwegian legal scholar
 Odd Selmer (born 1930), Norwegian journalist, novelist and playwright

See also
 Ågot Gjems Selmer or Gjems-Selmer (1858–1926), Norwegian actress, writer, and lecturer